Frederic Woodman Root (13 June 1846, Boston – 8 November 1916, Chicago) was an American composer, choir conductor, organist, adjudicator  and music teacher.

Early life and education

Root was the son of George Frederick Root,  who was known for composing Civil War songs. He studied music under BC Blodgett, William Mason, James Flint and Robert Goldbeck, and studied singing in New York City with Carlo Bassini and Luigi Vannuccini from Florence. From 1869 to 1870 he undertook a study tour of Europe.

Career
Root composed songs, cantatas, an operetta, and other works, including many for use in singing and piano lessons. He wrote articles and essays for a number of music related publications. Root was the editor of the periodical Song Messenger for several years.

Root became a singing teacher, and published several textbooks for singing lessons, including The Pacific Glee Book with James R. Murray, The School of Singing, and Root's New Course in Voice Culture and Singing.

Root gave lectures to promote his teaching methods and opinions about music in general.  In one of his speeches he characterized African American gospel songs as "developed from the formless and untutored sounds of savage people... being hardly developed to the point at which they might be called music".

References

External links 
 PD Music: The Music of Frederic Woodman Root (Short biography, works and writings)
 Virtual American Biographies - George Frederick Root
 Frederic Woodman Root at WorldCat

American male composers
American composers
American music educators
1846 births
1926 deaths